Hamarilla is a genus of sea snails, marine gastropod mollusks in the family Pyramidellidae, the pyrams and their allies.

Distribution
This marine genus occurs off the Solomon Islands.

Species
 Hamarilla amoebaea (R. B. Watson, 1886)
Species brought into synonymy
 Hamarilla bicarinata Eames & Wilkins, 1957 † : synonym of Hamarilla amoebaea (R. B. Watson, 1886)
 Hamarilla coacta (R. B. Watson, 1886) : synonym of Koloonella coacta (R. B. Watson, 1886)

References

 Laseron C.F. (1959). Family Pyramidellidae (Mollusca) from Northern Australia. Australian Journal of Marine and Freshwater Research. 10(2): 177-267
 Peñas A. & Rolán E. (2016). Deep water Pyramidelloidea from the central and South Pacific. 3. The tribes Eulimellini and Syrnolini. Universidade de Santiago de Compostela. 304 pp

External links
 

Pyramidellidae